A European Private Company (SPE) is a legal form for a limited liability company that is being proposed by the European Commission to be introduced across the European Union. It forms a company of limited liability, similar to the English limited company, the Austrian or the German GmbH, the Dutch BV, the Belgian BVBA or the French SARL. The aim of the proposal is to remove the current need for limited companies to reincorporate themselves in the corresponding legal form in all the EU member countries in which they want to trade, which represents a substantial administrative burden for small and medium enterprises. It was proposed that the SPE company form be introduced across the EU and EEA area from July 2010. The SPE was finally set to arrive in 2011 and is being slowed by the current ruling parties of Germany (CDU) to allow their own national alternative (the mini-GmbH) to grow first. The SPE could facilitate starting new businesses and European Integration and would thus help small businesses and entrepreneurs due to manageable capital requirements not too dissimilar to the British limited company (Ltd).

See also
 Societas Europaea
 Societas cooperativa Europaea

References

External links
"Think Small First": A Small Business Act For Europe

European Union corporate law
Types of business entity